Quincey may refer to:


People
 James Quincey (born 1965), CEO of The Coca Cola Company
 Kyle Quincey (born 1985), Canadian ice hockey player
 Thomas de Quincey (1785–1859), English author and intellectual

Fictional characters
 Quincey Morris, an American character in Bram Stoker's horror novel Dracula

Places
 Quincey, Côte-d'Or, France
 Quincey, Haute-Saône, France
 Ferreux-Quincey, Aube, France

See also
 Quincy (disambiguation)